The 27th Scripps National Spelling Bee was held in Washington, District of Columbia on May 20, 1954, sponsored by the E.W. Scripps Company.

The winner was William Cashore, 14, of Center Square, Pennsylvania, correctly spelling the word transept. William Kelly, 11, of Deering, Missouri, took second, and Patricia Brown, 14, of Birmingham, Alabama placed third.

There were 57 contestants that year, with 39 girls and 18 boys. Only one speller was a repeat contestant. The first place prize was $500 (plus $100 for expenses for a weekend trip to New York City and appearances on television), $300 for second, $100 for third, $20 each for the next 20 finishers, and $40 each for the remaining spellers.

Benson S. Alleman was the pronouncer.

References

Scripps National Spelling Bee competitions
1954 awards
1954 in education
1954 in Washington, D.C.
May 1954 events in the United States